Island Grove, Illinois may refer to:
Island Grove, Jasper County, Illinois
Island Grove, Sangamon County, Illinois
Island Grove Township, Sangamon County, Illinois